Splenii muscle may refer to: 
 Splenius capitis muscle
 Splenius cervicis muscle